This is a list of supermarket chains in Slovakia.

Hypermarkets

Cash & carry

Supermarkets 
  Billa 
  CBA 
  Coop Jednota 
  Delia 
  Fresh 
  Kraj 
  Lidl 
  Malina 
  Moj Obchod  (owned by Metro Cash & Carry)
  Terno 
  Yeme

Home improvement/do it yourself 
  Asko 
  Bauhaus 
  Decodom 
  Hornbach 
  IKEA 
  XXXLutz 
  Kinekus 
  Kondela 
  Merkury Market 
  Mountfield 
  Möbelix 
  Obi 
  Sconto Möbel

Consumer electronics 
 Datart 
 Euronics 
 Nay Elektrodom 
 Okey Elektrospotrebiče 
 Planeo Elektro

See also
List of shopping malls in Slovakia

References 

Supermarket

Slovakia